Shkodran is a masculine Albanian given name. Notable people with the name include:

Shkodran Metaj (born 1988), Dutch footballer of Kosovar Albanian descent
Shkodran Mustafi (born 1992), German footballer of Macedonian Albanian descent
Shkodran Maholli (born 1993), Swedish footballer of Kosovar Albanian descent

Albanian masculine given names